Olyra is a genus of catfishes of the family Bagridae. This genus occurs throughout South Asia and western Indochina, from India to western Thailand.

In Asia, Olyra species are known as fighting catfish; they are placed in small aquaria to battle one another similar to Siamese fighting fish, and money is bet on the outcome.

Taxonomy
The genus Olyra is considered by some authorities to belong to the family Bagridae, though Olyridae is considered valid by Fishbase. The taxonomic status of O. colletii has been a puzzle. It was first described in 1881 by Franz Steindachner as Heptapterus collettii and marked as neotropical in origin. With examination, though, it was determined to more closely match members of Olyra. It may even be a junior synonym of Olyra longicaudata. O. kempi is treated in some literature as a synonym of O. longicaudata.

Species
There are currently 8 recognized species in this genus:
 Olyra astrifera Arunachalam, Raja, Mayden & Chandran, 2013 
 Olyra burmanica F. Day, 1872 (Long-tail catfish)
 Olyra collettii (Steindachner, 1881)
 Olyra horae (Prashad & Mukerji, 1929)
 Olyra kempi Chaudhuri, 1912
 Olyra longicaudata McClelland, 1842
 Olyra praestigiosa H. H. Ng & Ferraris, 2016 
 Olyra saginata H. H. Ng, Lalramliana & Lalthanzara, 2014

References

Bagridae
Fish of South Asia
Catfish genera
Freshwater fish genera
Taxa named by John McClelland (doctor)